Pycnarmon pantherata is a moth in the family Crambidae. It was described by Arthur Gardiner Butler in 1878. It is found in Russia, Japan, China and Taiwan.

The wingspan is 23–26 mm.

References

Spilomelinae
Moths described in 1878
Moths of Asia